Wolf Creek is a stream in the U.S. state of Ohio. It is a tributary of the Sandusky River.

Wolf Creek was named for the frequent wolves seen by early settlers.

See also
List of rivers of Ohio

References

Rivers of Sandusky County, Ohio
Rivers of Seneca County, Ohio
Rivers of Ohio